, born 21 March 1955, is a Japanese chemist and Professor of Chemistry at The University of Tokyo in Japan. Currently heading the department of Chemistry and Inorganic Chemistry Laboratory in The University of Tokyo, he is a distinguished professor, researcher and pioneer in the field of synthesis and electrochemistry of conductive metal complex polymers.

His research is focused on creation of new electro- and photo-functional materials comprising both transition metals and π-conjugated chains, and invention of unidirectional electron transfer systems utilizing molecular layer interfaces. He is presently a Vice President of The Electrochemical Society of Japan, and the regional representative of Japan for International Society of Electrochemistry (ISE).

Education and professional experiences
1977 B.Sc. (Chemistry), The University of Tokyo
1982 D.Sc. (Chemistry), The University of Tokyo (Professor Yukiyoshi Sasaki)
1982-1990 Research Associate, Faculty of Science and Technology, Keio University (Professor Kunitsugu Aramaki)
1987-1989 Visiting Research Associate, The University of North Carolina at Chapel Hill (Professor Royce W. Murray)
1990 Lecturer, Faculty of Science and Technology, Keio University
1992 Associate Professor, Faculty of Science and Technology, Keio University (Interface Chemistry)
1993-1996 Researcher, PRESTO, Japan Science and Technology Agency (Research Supervisor: Prof. K. Honda)
1996–Present Professor, Department of Chemistry, School of Science, The University of Tokyo (Inorganic Chemistry)

Research interests
Coordination Chemistry, Organometallic Chemistry, Electrochemistry, Photochemistry, Nanomaterials

Awards and honours
1994 Young Scholar Lectureship, The Chemical Society of Japan
2003 The Chemical Society of Japan Award for Creative Work for 2002
2005 Lectureship from University of Bordeaux I
2009 Professorship from University of Strasbourg
2011 Docteur Honoris Causa from University of Bordeaux I
2012 Lectured at Distinguished Lecture Series in Hong Kong Baptist University and won Lectureship.
2014 Fellow for Royal Society of Chemistry
2014 Japan's Ministry of Education, Culture, Sports, Science and Technology (MEXT) Award for Science and Technology 2014

Reviews

References
1) 
2)

External links
Nishihara Laboratory Homepage
Profile: UTokyo, Department of Chemistry

1955 births
Living people
Japanese chemists
Academic staff of the University of Tokyo
Academic staff of Keio University
People from Kagoshima Prefecture